The 1970–71 Michigan Wolverines men's basketball team represented the University of Michigan in intercollegiate college basketball during the 1970–71 season.  The team played its home games at Crisler Arena on the school's campus in Ann Arbor, Michigan.

Under the direction of head coach Johnny Orr, the team finished second in the Big Ten Conference. Dan Fife served as team captain and shared team co-MVP honors with Henry Wilmore.

Over the course of the season, Ken Brady led the conference in field goal percentage with a 61.7% average in conference games.  The team earned the Big Ten scoring offense statistical championship with an 88.4 average in conference games.  The team was in the Associated Press Top Twenty Poll for four of the sixteen weeks of the season, rising as high as number twelve.  However, the team ended the season unranked in both the final UPI Coaches' Poll and the final AP Poll.

The team defeated two of the four ranked opponents that it faced during the season. The team was led by All-American Henry Wilmore. Dan Fife established the school career field goal percentage record at 57.44% that would last until Loy Vaught ended his career with a 61.7% mark in 1990. He also set the school single season assist average of 5.35 per game that would last until Dave Baxter surpassed it in 1978. The team set the school single-game record for free throws made of 33 on January 23, 1971, against , which would be unsurpassed until 1998.

Rankings

Team players drafted into the NBA
Five players from this team were selected in the NBA Draft.

References

Michigan
Michigan Wolverines men's basketball seasons
Michigan
Michigan Wolverines baske
Michigan Wolverines baske